The following is a list of high-speed trains that have been, are, or will be in commercial service.

In these tables, two or three maximum speeds are given: the column "Operated" refers to the maximum speed reached by the train in commercial operations, while the column "Design" refers to the theoretical maximum speed in commercial operations as announced by the manufacturer. Finally, a third "Record" speed may also be listed if there is an independently verified speed record.

Trains with power cars and multiple units

High-speed trains currently or soon in service

High-speed trains no longer in service

Experimental or modified

Conventionally wheeled locomotive-hauled 
As trains can have multiple configurations on the same service, service name is used as an identifier.

Currently or soon in service

No longer in service

Magnetically levitated

Currently or soon in service

Experimental

Notes

References

High-speed trains